Dash Robotics, Inc. is a toy robotics startup company located in Hayward, California. Their main focus is on prototyping and manufacturing smart toys (sometimes called "connected toys"). The company is often referred to simply as "Dash," and was founded in 2013. Often mistakenly affiliated with UC Berkeley, they are not a part of the university although many of the company's members met there.

Products 
They are most widely known for creating Kamigami Robots, a biomimetic, foldable robot that was funded via Kickstarter in 2015. Kamigami received attention for their unique biomimetic motion, which mimics that of a cockroach. The platform allows kids build their own robotic bugs. The original concepts behind the robot's motion are attributed to Dr. Robert Full, a biologist at UC Berkeley, and can be seen outlined in his Ted Talk. Mattel licensed the Kamigami brand in spring of 2017, and oversaw the national release in fall of 2017 as part of their new emphasis on STEM and "digital age" toys.

Previous products include Dash Beta and Dash VR. Dash Beta was a cardboard, app-controlled robot that required glue to be assembled, and acted as a predecessor to Kamigami. Dash Beta is no longer in production.

Awards 
Maker Faire Editor's Choice

See also 
 Smart toy
 Connected toys

References

Robotics companies of the United States
Companies based in Hayward, California
Robotics organizations